Thallarcha eremicola is a moth of the subfamily Arctiinae first described by Richard Thomas Martin Pescott in 1951. It is found in Australia.

References

External links
Original description: Memoirs of the National Museum of Victoria: 27–28.

Lithosiini
Moths described in 1951